Sites is an unincorporated community in Colusa County, California, United States. It lies at an elevation of 299 feet (91 m).Its ZIP code is 95979 and its area code is 530.

History
Carl E. Grunsky named the area for John H. Sites, a landholder, in 1887. The same year, a Post Office was established. It was discontinued in 1968.

Sites and the valley surrounding it have been considered a prime candidate for the location of the Sites Reservoir that would store water for the state system.

Politics

References

Made by Farah Essam

Unincorporated communities in California
Unincorporated communities in Colusa County, California